Beatrice Chebet (born 5 March 2000) is a Kenyan long-distance runner. In 2022, she won the silver medal in the 5000 metres at the World Championships, and became Commonwealth, African and Diamond League champion. Chebet claimed the gold medal for the women's senior race at the 2023 World Cross Country Championships.

She took the world under-20 title in the 5000 m in 2018 and at the 2019 World Cross Country Championships.

Career
In June 2018, at the age of 18, Chebet won the Kenyan Under-20s 5000 metres. A month later at Tampere 2018, she became the first Kenyan woman and the first non-Ethiopian since 2006 to win the 5000 m title at the World U20 Championships in Athletics.

At the 2019 World Cross Country Championships, the top three athletes in the women's U20 race – Chebet and the Ethiopian duo of Alemitu Tariku and Tsigie Gebreselama – were all awarded the time of 20:50 as they finished together. Tariku was initially announced as the winner, with Gebreselama awarded silver. However, after the photo finish footage was reviewed Chebet received the gold medal. Also 2019, she won the Kenyan U20 National Cross Country Championships.

Her best success of 2022 came in July at the World Championships in Eugene, Oregon, where she claimed the silver medal for the closely-run 5000 m race with a time of 14:46.75 behind Gudaf Tsegay in 14:46.29 and ahead of Dawit Seyaum (14:47.36).

Chebet trains in Londiani, Kericho County.

Achievements

International competitions

Circuit wins and titles, National titles
 Diamond League champion 5000 m:  2022
 2021: Doha Diamond League (3000 m  )
 2022: Zürich Weltklasse (5 km PB)
 World Athletics Cross Country Tour
 2022–23 (2): Atapuerca Cross Internacional, San Vittore Olona Cinque Mulini
 Kenyan Athletics Championships
 5000 metres: 2022

Personal Bests

References

External links

 

Living people
2000 births
Kenyan female cross country runners
Kenyan female long-distance runners
World Athletics U20 Championships winners
African Championships in Athletics winners
21st-century Kenyan women
Commonwealth Games gold medallists for Kenya
Commonwealth Games medallists in athletics
Athletes (track and field) at the 2022 Commonwealth Games
Medallists at the 2022 Commonwealth Games
World Athletics Cross Country Championships winners